Romariz is a Portuguese parish, located in the municipality of Santa Maria da Feira. The population in 2011 was 3,023, in an area of 11.08 km2. It is the home of Romariz F.C.

References

Freguesias of Santa Maria da Feira